Conisbrough is a ward and Denaby is a civil parish in the metropolitan borough of Doncaster, South Yorkshire, England.  The ward and parish contain 18 listed buildings that are recorded in the National Heritage List for England.  Of these, two are  listed at Grade I, the highest of the three grades, and the others are at Grade II, the lowest grade.   The listed buildings are in the town of Conisbrough, and the villages of Denaby Main and Old Denaby.  The most important buildings are Conisbrough Castle and St Peter's Church, both listed at Grade I.  The other listed buildings include houses, a medieval well cover, a set of stocks, a public house, a railway station and station house, a railway viaduct, two mileposts, another church and a chapel, a drinking fountain, and two war memorials.


Key

Buildings

References

Citations

Sources

 

Lists of listed buildings in South Yorkshire
Buildings and structures in the Metropolitan Borough of Doncaster
Listed